Bryantiella is a genus of flowering plants belonging to the family Polemoniaceae.

Its native range is Northwestern Mexico, Northern Chile.

Species:

Bryantiella palmeri

References

Polemoniaceae
Polemoniaceae genera